TriHealth is a unified health system based in Cincinnati, Ohio, United States. It was originally formed in 1995. Currently the system comprises four hospitals: Bethesda North, Good Samaritan, Bethesda Butler, and TriHealth Evendale Hospital. TriHealth's non-hospital services include physician practice management, fitness centers, occupational health centers, home health and hospice care. TriHealth is one of the largest employers in greater Cincinnati with over 11,000 employees.

History

In 1995, the sponsors of Bethesda Hospital and Good Samaritan Hospital formed a partnership to become TriHealth. TriHealth was named for a partnership of physicians, hospitals, and the community. In 2005, the organization initiated the first stages of extensive renovations and expansion at both hospitals.

In 2012, TriHealth terminated workers who refused the inoculation flu shots.

In December 2015, John Prout, president and chief executive of TriHealth, retired. Mark Clement is the current hospital executive. TriHealth announced an $85 million expansion in Montgomery in January 2020.

In April 2021, TriHealth reported that some information on employees or patients had fallen victim to a security breach through a law firm the company uses.

References

Healthcare in Ohio
Hospital networks in the United States
Non-profit organizations based in Cincinnati
Catholic hospital networks in the United States
Catholic hospitals in North America
Catholic health care